Gârleni is a commune in Bacău County, Western Moldavia, Romania. It is composed of four villages: Gârleni, Gârlenii de Sus (Rácsila; the commune residence), Lespezi (Lészped) and Șurina. At the 2002 census, 98.7% of the inhabitants were Romanians, 0.7% Hungarians and 0.5% Csangos. 64% were Roman Catholic, 35% Romanian Orthodox and 0.5% Adventists.

References

Communes in Bacău County
Localities in Western Moldavia